Gogoella is an extinct genus of trilobite in the class Trilobita. There is one described species in Gogoella, G. brevis.

Some place it in the family Pliomeridae.

References

Pliomeridae
Articles created by Qbugbot